Dracula the Undead is a sequel written to Bram Stoker's classic novel Dracula, written by Freda Warrington. The book was commissioned by Penguin Books as a sequel to Stoker's original novel for the centenary of the latter's first publication. It takes place seven years after the original. It was originally published in 1997, and was brought back to print in 2009.

Synopsis: The legend returns 
It is seven years since a stake was driven through the heart of the infamous Count Dracula. Seven years which have not eradicated the terrible memories for Jonathan and Mina Harker, who now have a young son. To lay their memories to rest they return to Transylvania, and can find no trace of the horrific events. But, beneath the earth, Dracula's soul lies in limbo, waiting for the Lifeblood that will revive him.

References 

1997 British novels
Dracula novels
Epistolary novels
British Gothic novels
Invasion literature
North Yorkshire
Novels set in Romania
Sequel novels
Transylvania in fiction
Vampire novels
British horror novels
Penguin Books